"Hot Girl Summer" is a song by American rapper Megan Thee Stallion featuring Nicki Minaj and Ty Dolla Sign, released on August 9, 2019 by 300 Entertainment. It was written by all three artists alongside Michael "Crazy Mike" Foster, Syed Hossain, Derrick Milano, Jordan "Juicy J" Houston and Georges “Bone Collector“ Olivier, with additional writing credits going to Earl On The Beat, JT (from City Girls), and Lil Yachty for the sampling of City Girls' 2019 song "Act Up"; the song was produced by Bone Collector, Juicy J, and Crazy Mike. Commercially, the song debuted and peaked at number eleven on the Billboard Hot 100. On Billboards Rhythmic Songs airplay chart, it became Megan Thee Stallion's first number one, Nicki Minaj's eighth and Ty Dolla Sign's third.

Background
In July 2019, the term "hot girl summer" went viral on social media and subsequently became a meme prior to the release of the song. The title originally stems from a line on "Cash Shit" where the rapper calls herself "thee hot girl". The phrase also appeared on the artwork for her 2019 mixtape Fever. Megan first teased the song in a tweet on July 18, stating "I feel like it's only right I drop a hot girl summer song before the summer is over." On July 28, 2019, Megan posted a snippet of the song to her Instagram. She also revealed the release date to be August 2 but it was later postponed to August 9. On August 5, 2019, it was announced that the song would feature Nicki Minaj which turned out to be the cause for the delay. Minaj revealed that the collaboration almost did not happen due to her almost losing her voice.

Music video 
On September 3, 2019, the music video for the song was released. Directed by Munachi Osegbu, the video shows the artists at a pool party. Multiple celebrities make cameo appearances, including Agnez Mo, Rico Nasty, Dreezy, La La Anthony, Ari Lennox, Summer Walker, DaniLeigh, Juicy J, and French Montana.

Live performances
Megan performed the song for the first time at the 2019 MTV Video Music Awards, in a medley with "Cash Shit".

Personnel
Credits adapted from Tidal.

 Megan Thee Stallion – lead vocals
 Nicki Minaj – featured vocals
 Ty Dolla Sign – featured vocals
 Bone Collector – production
 Juicy J – production
 Crazy Mike – production

Awards and nominations

Charts

Weekly charts

Year-end charts

Certifications

References

2019 singles
2019 songs
300 Entertainment singles
Megan Thee Stallion songs
Nicki Minaj songs
Ty Dolla Sign songs
Songs written by Juicy J
Songs written by Lil Yachty
Songs written by Megan Thee Stallion
Songs written by Nicki Minaj
Songs written by Ty Dolla Sign